The 1974 NCAA Division III Soccer Championship was the inaugural tournament held by the NCAA to determine the top men's Division III college soccer program in the United States.

Brockport State defeated Swarthmore in the championship match, 3–1, to win their first Division III national title.

The semifinals and final were played at Wheaton College in Wheaton, Illinois.

Bracket

Final

See also  
 1974 NCAA Division I Soccer Tournament
 1974 NCAA Division II Soccer Championship
 1974 NAIA Soccer Championship

References 

NCAA
NCAA Division III Men's Soccer Championship
NCAA Division II Soccer Championship